José García (born May 4, 1968) is a Venezuelan former professional boxer. At the 1988 Summer Olympics he lost in the second round of the men's welterweight division (– 67 kg) to Poland's eventual bronze medalist Jan Dydak.

References
Profile

External links

1968 births
Living people
Welterweight boxers
Olympic boxers of Venezuela
Boxers at the 1988 Summer Olympics
Venezuelan male boxers
Place of birth missing (living people)
20th-century Venezuelan people